Papiliotrema laurentii (synonym Cryptococcus laurentii) is a species of fungus in the family Rhynchogastremaceae. It is typically isolated in its yeast state.

In its yeast state, it is a rare human pathogen, able to provoke a skin condition, or fungemia in immunocompromised hosts.

It can also be used as sole source of food for the rearing of Caenorhabditis elegans.

References 

Tremellomycetes
Yeasts